Dulay or Duley is a surname, that may refer to:

Don Dulay (born 1980), Filipino basketball player
Giles Duley (born 1971), British photographer
Larry Dulay Itliong (1913–1977), American labor leader
Margaret Duley (1894–1968), Canadian writer
Thor Dulay (born 1980), Filipino singer

See also
Dulay Qarqi, a village in Iran